Archaeosynthemis leachii is a species of dragonfly of the family Synthemistidae,
known as the twinspot tigertail.
It is a medium-sized dragonfly with black and yellow markings. It inhabits streams, seepages and swamps in south-western Australia.

Archaeosynthemis leachii has been known as Synthemis leachii.

Gallery

See also
 List of Odonata species of Australia

References

Synthemistidae
Odonata of Australia
Endemic fauna of Australia
Taxa named by Edmond de Sélys Longchamps
Insects described in 1871